Carl Myrie Abrahams OD (14 May 1911 – 10 April 2005) was a Jamaican painter from Saint Andrew Parish.

Biography
Abrahams was born in St Andrew, Jamaica to a middle class family. He began his career in commercial art at the age of 17 as a cartoonist and an illustrator for The Daily Gleaner and the Jamaica Times  as well as creating ads for Myers Rum and the Jamaica Biscuit Company.

In 1937, while on a working holiday in Jamaica, Augustus John, the iconic British artist, encouraged Abrahams to begin painting professionally. Abrahams taught himself to paint through self-study courses and manuals and by copying masterpieces from art books.

In 1944, during World War II Abrahams served in the Royal Air Force in England. By the mid-1950s he had found his calling as a painter of religious subjects.

The National Gallery of Jamaica said of his monumental series of 20 paintings of The Passion of Christ that "the devout sentiment of a true believer marked Abrahams as Jamaica and the Caribbean's finest religious painter."

Abrahams was a devout Christian and many of works revolved around religious themes with undeniable authenticity, paintings such as The Last Supper showcase Abrahams ability to add contemporary elements and twists to iconic religious parables.

He was awarded the Musgrave Gold Medal for his work by the Institute of Jamaica in 1987.

His final decades saw few new developments in his style and he often repeated or created variations on many of his earlier paintings. Abrahams described himself as an internationalist and was regarded by others as artistically a "citizen of the world". Abrahams died peacefully at his home in 2005 of cancer and a brain tumor.

Works
Last Supper
Destruction of Port Royal
Woman I Must Be About My Father's Business
Adam and Eve
Thirteen Israelites
The Henry Ford Show
Pan and His Musicians
Backyard Preacher
The Hand of Columbus
The Ascension
Hallelujah
"Afro Jewess"

Awards
Royal Air Force (RAF) Award
New York Critics Award
Silver Musgrave Medal of the Institution of Jamaica
Order of Distinction (Jamaica)
Gold Musgrave Medal of The Institution of Jamaica (1987)

References

Further reading 
Annie Paul. Father Carl Abrahams. Issue 75 (September/October 2005) Caribbean Beat Magazine 
Veerle Poupeye. Caribbean Art.  London; Thames and Hudson; 1998.

1911 births
2005 deaths
People from Saint Andrew Parish, Jamaica
Artists from Kingston, Jamaica
Recipients of the Musgrave Medal
Recipients of the Order of Distinction
Royal Air Force personnel of World War II
20th-century Jamaican painters